"Papa Don't Take No Mess" is a funk song performed by James Brown. An edited version of the song released as a two-part single in 1974 was Brown's 17th and final number one R&B hit and peaked at number thirty-one on the Hot 100. The full-length version, nearly 14 minutes long, appeared on the double album Hell.

Like "The Payback," "Papa Don't Take No Mess" was originally recorded for a rejected soundtrack to the blaxploitation film Hell Up in Harlem.

Record World said that the song is "carefully fashioned from disco and pure black
leather funk."

Personnel
 James Brown - lead vocal

with Fred Wesley and The J.B.'s:
 Fred Wesley - trombone
 Ike Oakley - trumpet
 Maceo Parker - alto saxophone
 St. Clair Pinckney - tenor saxophone
 Jimmy Nolen - guitar
 Hearlon "Cheese" Martin - guitar
 Fred Thomas - bass
 John "Jabo" Starks - drums
 John Morgan or Johnny Griggs - percussion

A piano solo, performed by Brown, is included in the longer edit that appears on the Hell album.

Covers and samples 
Steely Dan covered this song in the band introduction segment of their "Rarities night" concerts in September 2011.

The song, like much part of Brown's catalogue, was sampled into many other compositions, most notably in Janet Jackson's 1993 hit song "That's the Way Love Goes".

References

External links

List of songs that sample "Papa Don't Take No Mess"

James Brown songs
1974 singles
Songs written by James Brown
Songs written by Fred Wesley
Songs written by John "Jabo" Starks
1974 songs
Polydor Records singles